In epidemiology, the next-generation matrix is used to derive the basic reproduction number, for a compartmental model of the spread of infectious diseases. In population dynamics it is used to compute the basic reproduction number for structured population models.  It is also used in multi-type branching models for analogous computations.

The method to compute the basic reproduction ratio using the next-generation matrix is given by Diekmann et al. (1990) and van den Driessche and Watmough (2002). To calculate the basic reproduction number by using a next-generation matrix, the whole population is divided into  compartments in which there are  infected compartments. Let  be the numbers of infected individuals in the  infected compartment at time t. Now, the epidemic model is

, where  

In the above equations,  represents the rate of appearance of new infections in compartment .   represents the rate of transfer of individuals into compartment  by all other means, and  represents the rate of transfer of individuals out of compartment .
The above model can also be written as

where

 

and

 

Let  be the disease-free equilibrium.

 

and

 
respectively.

Now, the matrix  is known as the next-generation matrix. Next generation matrices can be computationally evaluated from observational data, which is often the most productive approach where there are large numbers of compartments.

See also
Mathematical modelling of infectious disease

References

Sources
 
 
 

Matrices
Epidemiology